Greg Cox (born 1959) is an American writer of science fiction, including works that are media tie-ins. He lives in Oxford, Pennsylvania.

He has written numerous Star Trek novels, including The Eugenics Wars (Volume One and Two), The Q Continuum, Assignment: Eternity, and The Black Shore. His short fiction can be found in such anthologies as Star Trek: Tales of the Dominion War, Star Trek: The Amazing Stories and Star Trek: Enterprise logs. His first "Khan" novel, The Eugenics Wars: Volume One, was voted best sci-fi book of the year by the readers of Dreamwatch magazine. Cox can be found in a bonus feature on the "Director's Edition" DVD of Star Trek II: The Wrath of Khan.

Bibliography

Star Trek novels

Star Trek: The Original Series
Assignment: Eternity (1997), 
The Rings of Time (2012) 
The Weight of Worlds (2013) 
No Time Like the Past (2014) 
Foul Deeds Will Rise (2014) 
Child of Two Worlds (2015) 
Miasma (2016) (ebook)
Legacies: Book 1 – Captain to Captain (2016) 
The Antares Maelstrom (2019) 
A Contest of Principles (2020) 
Star Trek: The Next Generation
Dragon's Honor (1996), with Kij Johnson
Star Trek: Deep Space Nine
Devil in the Sky (1995), with John Gregory Betancourt
Star Trek: Voyager
The Black Shore (1997), 
Star Trek: The Next Generation: The Q Continuum:
Q-Space (1998), 
Q-Zone (1998), 
Q-Strike (1998), 
Star Trek: The Eugenics Wars: The Rise and Fall of Khan Noonien Singh
Volume 1 (2001), 
Volume 2 (2002), 
Star Trek: To Reign in Hell: The Exile of Khan Noonien Singh (2005),

Other novels
The Pirate Paradox (1991), (with Nick Baron).
Roswell: Loose Ends (2001), 
Buffy the Vampire Slayer: Tales of the Slayer, Vol. 2 (2002),  (short story) 
Daredevil (2003),  (novelization)
Underworld:
Underworld (2003),  (novelization)
Blood Enemy (2004), 
Evolution (2005),  (novelization)
Rise of the Lycans (2009),  (novelization)
Buffy the Vampire Slayer: Tales of the Slayer, Vol. 4 (2004),  (short story)
Fantastic Four: War Zone (2005), 
Alias: Two of a Kind? (2005), 
Alias: The Road Not Taken (2005), 
Infinite Crisis (2006), 
Iron Man: The Armor Trap (1995) 
Iron Man: Operation A.I.M. (1996) 
52 (2007) 
Countdown (2009) 
The 4400
The Vesuvius Prophecy (2008), 
Welcome to Promise City (2009), 
Terminator Salvation: Cold War (2009), 
Final Crisis (2010), 
Warehouse 13: A Touch of Fever (2011), 
The Dark Knight Rises (2012),  (novelization)
Man of Steel (2013),  (novelization)
Leverage: The Bestseller Job (2013) 
Godzilla: The Official Novelization (2014) 
The Librarians
The Librarians and the Lost Lamp (2016) 
The Librarians and the Mother Goose Chase (2017) 
The Librarians and the Pot of Gold (2019) 
Batman: The Court of Owls (2019)

Short fiction
"Almost 11", Aboriginal Science Fiction, December 1986 , 
"Catwomen", The Further Adventures of Batman, Vol 3, Featuring Catwoman edited by Martin H. Greenberg, Bantam Books (1993)
"The Weeping Woman", Tales of Zorro edited by Richard Dean Starr, Moonstone Books (2008),

Non-fiction 
 The Transylvanian Library: A Consumer's Guide to Vampire Fiction, Borgo Press, 1991

References

External links

1959 births
Living people
American science fiction writers
American speculative fiction critics
Science fiction critics
20th-century American novelists
21st-century American novelists
American male novelists
20th-century American male writers
21st-century American male writers
20th-century American non-fiction writers
21st-century American non-fiction writers
American male non-fiction writers